Leopold David Verney, 21st Baron Willoughby de Broke,  (born 14 September 1938), is a British hereditary peer and member of the House of Lords.

Early life
Leopold David Verney was born on 14 September 1938. The only son of John Verney, 20th Baron Willoughby de Broke and Rachel Wrey, Verney was educated at Le Rosey in Switzerland and at New College, Oxford where he studied modern languages (BA, then Oxbridge MA).

Career
He inherited his father's title in 1986 and is one of the 90 hereditary peers elected to remain in the House of Lords after the passing of the House of Lords Act 1999; originally elected a Conservative peer, he defected to the UK Independence Party (UKIP) in January 2007, making him one of only four UKIP members at Westminster.

Since 1992, he has been Chairman of the St Martin's Theatre Company Ltd. - the building of the St Martin's Theatre was commissioned by his grandfather. From 1999 to 2004, he was President of the Heart of England Tourist Board.

From 1990 to 2004, Willoughby de Broke was Patron of the Warwickshire Association of Boys' Clubs and from 2005 to the present has been Chairman of the Warwickshire Hunt. Since 2002 he has been a governor of the Royal Shakespeare Theatre and also since 2002 the president of the Warwickshire branch of the Campaign to Protect Rural England. He is a Fellow of the Royal Society of Arts (FRSA) and of the Royal Geographical Society (FRGS).

On 19 November 2009, Willoughby de Broke introduced the Constitutional Reform Bill 2009-10 into the House of Lords, with clauses to repeal the European Communities Act 1972 and the Human Rights Act 1998, to reduce the powers of the House of Commons and government, to reduce MPs' pay, and to give more power to local authorities.

On 29 May 2012, Willoughby de Broke introduced the Referendum (European Union) Bill 2012–13 to the House of Lords, to make provision for the holding of a referendum on the United Kingdom's continued membership of the European Union, on the same day as the next General Election.

He left UKIP in the autumn of 2018.

Personal life
He married Petra Aird, the daughter of Colonel Sir John Renton Aird, Bart., in 1965. They divorced in 1989, and in 2003 he married secondly Alexandra du Luart, only daughter of Sir Adam Butler and a granddaughter of one-time Deputy Prime Minister Rab Butler. He has two sons by his first marriage, Rupert and John Verney, and two stepdaughters.

The heir apparent to the title is his elder son, the Hon Rupert Greville Verney (born 1966).

References

External links
www.dodonline.co.uk
www.cracroftspeerage.co.uk
Debrett's People of Today
paternal ancestry
maternal ancestry
thepeerage.com

1938 births
Living people
Alumni of Institut Le Rosey
Alumni of New College, Oxford
Conservative Party (UK) hereditary peers
Fellows of the Royal Geographical Society
Deputy Lieutenants of Warwickshire
UK Independence Party hereditary peers
David
21
Hereditary peers elected under the House of Lords Act 1999